Jean Perniceni was a French professional basketball player and coach. Jean Perniceni was born in Bagnolet, Seine-Saint-Denis. He played as a shooting guard-small forward (swingman). He was inducted into the French Basketball Hall of Fame, in 2009.

Club playing career
Perniceni played with various French clubs, from 1947 to 1960. He won 4 French League championships (1953, 1954, 1958, 1960), and two French Cups (1958, 1959). Between those, he played for Racing Club de France from 1953 to 1954 as well as AS Monaco Basket and Caen Basket Calvados. In 1952 he participated in Helsinki Summer Olympics.

Club coaching career
In 1958, Perniceni became the head coach of Charleville-Mézières. He retired in 1967.

Death
Perniceni died in June 2010.

References

External links
FIBA Profile
Basketball-Reference.com Profile
Olympedia.org Profile

1930 births
2010 deaths
AS Monaco Basket players
Basketball players at the 1952 Summer Olympics
Caen Basket Calvados players
Étoile Charleville-Mézières coaches
Étoile Charleville-Mézières players
French basketball coaches
French men's basketball players
French expatriate sportspeople in Monaco
Olympic basketball players of France
Paris Racing Basket players
Shooting guards
Small forwards
Sportspeople from Seine-Saint-Denis
1954 FIBA World Championship players
1950 FIBA World Championship players